Eupithecia cercina is a moth in the family Geometridae first described by Herbert Druce in 1893. It is found in Mexico.

The forewings are pale pinkish brown, but dark reddish brown towards the base and crossed by a brownish-black band. The hindwings are greyish white, with the inner margin bordered with blackish brown. The outer margin is dusky.

References

Moths described in 1893
cercina
Moths of Central America